Heggs is a surname. Notable people with the surname include:

Alvin Heggs (born 1967), American basketball player
Carl Heggs (born 1970), English footballer and manager
Rosalind Heggs (born 1952), English cricketer

See also
Hegg